Autism: The Musical is an independent documentary film directed by Tricia Regan. In April 2007, the film premiered at the Tribeca Film Festival in New York City. The film recounts six months of the lives of five children who are on the autism spectrum in Los Angeles, California as they write and rehearse for an original stage production.

Synopsis
The film recounts six months in the 2005-06 lives of five autistic children and their parents in Los Angeles, California as their children write and rehearse for an original stage production. The children featured in the film have one or more things they excel at doing if only given the training they need to communicate and develop those skills.

Several of the parents appearing in the film are well known in their own right, such as Rosanne Katon-Walden, her husband Richard M Walden, and Stephen Stills. They and the other parents round out a cast of real-life parents struggling with their strained marriages while dealing with the sometimes overwhelming needs of their children with autism.

Production
An idea for the film was first raised in July 2005, as a potential 48 Hour Film Project, but did not materialize.  However, in that same year, noted acting coach Elaine Hall founded The Miracle Project, a nonprofit, Sherman Oaks, California based theater group for children with autism and other disabilities. In late 2005, Tricia Regan began filming the six-month rehearsal process at Vista Del Mar Child and Family Services recreation room in Los Angeles. Regan is said to have collected more than 400 hours of raw material, winnowing the documentary to five complementary family narratives. The title of the film emerged only in the late stages of editing.

In March 2007, reality show producers Bunim/Murray Productions expanded its business into films and made Autism: The Musical its first acquisition. Bunim/Murray Productions came on board toward the end of shooting to join In Effect Films in producing the film.

Distribution
After its premiere on April 18, 2007 at Robert De Niro's sixth annual Tribeca Film Festival, the film enjoyed a limited theatrical run in several US cities in 2007. Among its many awards, the film received the best documentary award at the 10th annual Newport International Film Festival in June 2007. The film was purchased for broadcast beginning March 25, 2008 by HBO.

The film was released on DVD in 2008 by Docurama Films.

Accolades
On November 19, 2007, Autism: The Musical was named by the Academy of Motion Picture Arts and Sciences as one of 15 films on its documentary feature Oscar short list. The film has won awards at 7 major film festivals in the U.S. Following its television broadcast on HBO, the film garnered two 2008 Emmy awards, for nonfiction film editing as well as Primetime Emmy Award for Outstanding Documentary or Nonfiction Special.

Sequel
On April 2, 2020, it was announced that a sequel titled Autism: The Sequel will premiere on April 28, 2020.

See also
List of films about Autism
Autism spectrum disorders in the media
Stanley Greenspan – His floortime approach to engage autism inspired Elaine Hall to create The Miracle Project, the subject of Autism: The Musical.

References

Further reading
Hart, Hugh. (March 23, 2008) The New York Times *A Season of Song, Dance and Autism. Section: AR; Page 20.

External links

2007 documentary films
2000s musical films
2007 films
American documentary films
American independent films
American musical films
Documentary films about autism
Documentary films about children with disability
Films shot in Los Angeles
Music therapy
2007 independent films
HBO documentary films
Primetime Emmy Award-winning broadcasts
2000s English-language films
2000s American films
Films about disability